Bespalovsky is a rural locality (a settlement) and the administrative center of Cherepanovsky Selsoviet, Zmeinogorsky District, Altai Krai, Russia. The population was 703 as of 2013. There are 12 streets.

Geography 
Bespalovsky is located 7 km northeast of Zmeinogorsk (the district's administrative centre) by road. Cherepanovsky is the nearest rural locality.

References 

Rural localities in Zmeinogorsky District